BCQ may refer to:

Barachak railway station, West Bengal, India (station code)
Bible College of Queensland, Australia
Brak Airport, Libya (IATA code)
British Cycle Quest, a competition
Business Communication Quarterly, an academic journal